The Eagle 69, also known as the Eagle Mark 7, was an open-wheel race car developed and built by Dan Gurney's All American Racers team, designed to compete in USAC IndyCar racing, starting in the 1969 season.

References 

Open wheel racing cars
American Championship racing cars